Phrynarachne fatalis is a species of spider of the family Thomisidae. It is endemic to Sri Lanka.

References

Thomisidae
Spiders of Asia
Endemic fauna of Sri Lanka
Spiders described in 1899
Taxa named by Octavius Pickard-Cambridge